Poile Zedek Synagogue was a historic synagogue at 145 Neilson Street in New Brunswick, Middlesex County, New Jersey.

The congregation was founded in 1901 by a group of merchants in downtown New Brunswick's Hiram Market district.  Originally named the Independent Sick and Death Benefit Association of New Brunswick, the congregation moved to its current location in 1905 and at some point began using the name Poile Zedek ("Workers of Righteousness").  The cornerstone ceremony was held for a new building on August 19, 1923, and the building was completed in 1924. The synagogue was added to the National Register of Historic Places on October 25, 1995 for its significance in architecture and religion. It is a brick building designed with Romanesque Revival style.

On Friday afternoon, October 23, 2015, a massive fire broke out in the synagogue, gutting the building. The fire is believed to be accidental.

In 2021, a 12-unit apartment building named The Lofts at Neilson Crossings was constructed within the preserved exterior walls of the former synagogue.

2008 cemetery vandalism
In January 2008, almost 500 gravestones at Poile Zedek's cemetery (also used by Congregation Etz Ahaim, a Sephardic congregation founded by Jews from Salonica) were damaged in an incident of vandalism.  Four local teenagers were charged and later sentenced to probation and community service in a juvenile court proceeding.

2015 fire
According to police, a large fire broke out on the first floor of the synagogue on October 23, 2015 at around 4:30 p.m., destroying all but the exterior of the building. One Sefer Torah was rescued by the rabbi before the roof collapsed.  According to the congregation's rabbi, the external structure remains sound and the building may eventually be repaired. Religious documents and scripts damaged by the fire were later buried in the affiliated cemetery.

Gallery

References

External links
 

Buildings and structures in New Brunswick, New Jersey
Greek-Jewish culture in the United States
National Register of Historic Places in Middlesex County, New Jersey
New Jersey Register of Historic Places
Religious buildings and structures in Middlesex County, New Jersey
Synagogues on the National Register of Historic Places in New Jersey
Romanesque Revival church buildings in New Jersey
Synagogues completed in 1923
Synagogues in New Jersey
2015 fires in the United States
Sephardi synagogues
Sephardi Jewish culture in New Jersey
Cemetery vandalism and desecration